Kiltane (Irish: Cill tSéadhna) is a parish in Erris, North County Mayo, Ireland.

Origins
Kiltane derives its name from Cill tSéadhna, or Seadhna's church, which was in the townland of Kiltane by the banks of the Owenmore River.  The name 'Seadhna' was well known in the Early Christian Period.  There is mention of a bishop and priest of that name in an old tract but no detail as to where they worked.  The name was common in the family from which Darbiled (Dervilla) and Fighernan came, both of whom preached in Erris.  A huge part of this parish is blanket bog which was acquired by Bord na Mona.  From it they transported milled peat to the now defunct, peat-fuelled power station at Bellacorick, now the site of a large wind farm.

History
For administrative purposes as well as limiting the number of Catholic clergy during the Penal times (17th century), Erris was divided into two parishes, namely, Kilcommon and Kilmore. (This territorial arrangement is still adhered to for civil and statutory purposes).  Only one priest was permitted to serve each parish.  In 1704, Fr. Michael Monnely, serving Kilcommon, lived at Cloontikilla.  In 1731, there were two priests, no Mass house, many wandering friars and hedge schools abounded.

In a Government document of 1801 compiled from data supplied by the local Catholic bishops, Kilcommon is given as still having only two priests.  Their combined income was £90.  The same list notes that Ballycroy also had two priests with a combined annual income of £80.

About 1825, after the building of Belmullet town had begun, Kilcommon was divided into two parishes; Kilcommon West (the present parish of Belmullet including Geesala and Doohoma) and Kilcommon East (namely, the present Kilcommon parish plus Bangor and Ballymonnelly areas).

The boundaries were again altered in August 1873 when the present parish of Kiltane, Erris, was formed and the ancient name was restored.

Townlands
Kiltane contains the following townlands:-
 Altnabrocky
 Attawalla
 Ballina-Erris
 Ballybeg
 Bangor Erris
 Bellacorick
 Bellanumera
 Briska
 Cloontakilla
 Croaghaun
 Darraragh
 Doohoma
 Doolough
 Dooyork
 Drumanaffrin
 Gweesalia
 Glencullen Upper and Lower
 Glenturk Beg and More
 Goolamore
 Kilsallagh
 Kiltane
 Largan Beg and More
 Lenanadurtaun
 Muingaghel
 Muingnahalloona
 Muinghanarnad
 Rosnagleragh
 Roy
 Sheean
 Sheskin
 Srahanarry
 Srahgraddy
 Srahmore - notorious claim to fame: the bog from Bellanaboy was dumped here by Royal Dutch Shell in 2007.
 Srahnakilla
 Tarsaghaun More
 Tavnagh
 Tavnanasool
 Tristia (Mount Jubilee)
 Tullaghanbaun
 Tullaghanduff
 Tullaghaunnashammer
 Uggool

References

Civil parishes of County Mayo
Erris